George Floyd Square, officially George Perry Floyd Square, is the commemorative street name for the section of Chicago Avenue in the U.S. city of Minneapolis from East 37th Street to East 39th Street. It is named after George Floyd, a Black man who was murdered there by Minneapolis police officer Derek Chauvin on May 25, 2020. The streetway and memorial site is centered at the 38th and Chicago intersection.

Public outrage over Floyd's murder resulted in the largest mass protest movement since the civil rights movement, largely over issues of systemic racism and police brutality. Racial justice activists and some community members erected barricades and closed the 38th and Chicago street intersection to vehicular traffic for over a year during the George Floyd Square occupied protest in 2020 and 2021. Artists and demonstrators installed several exhibits, paintings, sculptures, and other works of art to memorialize Floyd and visualize racial justice themes.

The City of Minneapolis officially designated the streetway as George Perry Floyd Square in 2022. Long-term planning for an official, permanent memorial to Floyd at the site is underway.

Geography 

Chicago Avenue is a major north–south thorough fare in Minneapolis. It was named Ames Street in an 1855 city plat map. Sometime in the late 1880s, the Minneapolis City Council changed the name of Ames Street to Chicago Avenue, but historians are unsure exactly when or why the street was renamed.

Chicago Avenue intersects East 38th Street in the city's Powderhorn community. The 38th and Chicago street intersection is a border for several city neighborhoods: Bancroft, Bryant, Central, and Powderhorn Park.

History

Murder of George Floyd 

The East 38th Street and Chicago Avenue intersection was the location of the murder of George Floyd by Derek Chauvin, an officer with the Minneapolis Police Department. Chauvin, a White man, knelt on the neck of Floyd, an unarmed Black man, for about 9 minutes and 29 seconds while Floyd begged for help, said he could not breathe, lost consciousness, and died on May 25, 2020. The incident, which occurred in the street outside the Cup Foods store, was filmed by bystanders and circulated widely in the media. In reaction to Floyd's murder, protests began locally on May 26, 2020, and gave way to widespread civil unrest. After several days, the Black Lives Matter movement protests spread throughout the United States and to many other countries.

Autonomous zone 

Soon after Floyd's murder, people left memorials to him near the Cup Foods store. The street intersection soon transitioned to an occupation protest referred to as George Floyd Square as protesters erected barricades to block vehicular traffic and transformed the space with public art of Floyd and that of other racial justice themes. The physical occupation of the street intersection after Floyd's murder persisted for over a year, but it was not without controversy. Some local businesses objected to the street closure and some neighbors felt perceptions that the area was "autonomous" or police-free led to an increase in violent crime. The city reopened the street intersection to vehicular traffic on June 20, 2021, but the protest movement that was rooted there persisted into 2022.

Official designation and planning 
In September 2020, the city named the two-block section of Chicago Avenue from East 37th Street (northern end) to East 39th Street (southern end) as "George Perry Floyd Jr. Place". The city again renamed the street way as "George Perry Floyd Square", with an inauguration ceremony taking place on May 25, 2022, the second anniversary of Floyd's murder.

Minneapolis officials designated the broader East 38th Street corridor as one of seven city cultural districts in late 2020. As part of the cultural district's long-term design plan, officials sought to preserve public art installments at the 38th and Chicago intersection that emerged in the aftermath of George Floyd's murder. The City of Minneapolis stated in mid 2021 that it would work with the local community to establish a permanent memorial at the street intersection. In 2022, the City of Minneapolis began a process to "re-envision" the streets of 38th Street East and Chicago Avenue to permanently incorporate memorials to George Floyd and make transportation improvements. The regional Metro Transit authority removed a previously planned rapid bus stop on the METRO D Line at 38th Street and Chicago Avenue, but said they would engage with the community on future plans for the area.

Amongst the protest occupation and permanent memorial planning, incidents of violent crime at the square area led to broader public discussion about public safety and policing. By August 14, 2022, seven people had been killed by gun violence at the square since Floyd's murder,  and one person had died there as the result of a drug overdose.

Visitors 
George Floyd Square has hosted thousands of visitors from around the world. Caretakers for the memorial do not view the site as a tourist destination, but as a place for reflection about issues of racism and injustice. The site has been likened to other monuments of historic trauma, such as the Vietnam Veterans Memorial in Washington, D.C., and the Lorraine Motel in Memphis, Tennessee, where Martin Luther King Jr. was assassinated.

Other notable features

Chicago Avenue Fire Arts Center 

The Chicago Avenue Fire Arts Center occupies the space of the historic Nokomis Theater on the 3700 block of Chicago Avenue. The building was originally constructed in 1915 and designed by architect Joseph E. Nason. The theater was expanded in 1928 and remained for several decades until it closed in 1952 along with the Chicago Avenue streetcar line. The structure was significantly altered and was later used as an automobile repair shop until the building and many original architectural details were restored in the 2000s. The arts center was founded in 2007 by residents in the Central and Bryant neighborhoods with the goal to increase equity in public art. By 2020, the center was serving 800 artists per year.

Cup Foods 

Cup Foods, located on the 3700 block of Chicago Avenue, opened in 1989 as a combination grocery store, convenience store, and restaurant in the Powderhorn community in Minneapolis. Cup Foods was founded by Samir Abumayyaleh, who was born in Palestine and emigrated to the United States as a child. The name of the store was originally Chicago Unbeatable Prices, but later shortened to CUP. The area around the store had also been the location of violent crime, illicit drug dealing, loitering, and undercover police surveillance since the 1990s. In 2000, the city temporarily shut the store down for several months after recovering stolen electronics, ammunition, and materials for illicit drugs inside Cup Foods–leading to a constant police presence around the property.

On May 25, 2020, a 9-1-1 call from an employee at Cup Foods led to the fatal encounter between George Floyd and the Minneapolis police. The employee reported that Floyd had paid using a suspected counterfeit $20 bill. Derek Chauvin and three other police officers arrived in response, and they arrested and detained Floyd. During the arrest, Chauvin pinned Floyd by his neck on the ground for 9 minutes and 29 seconds while as he struggled to breathe and died. Several bystanders attempted to intervene unsuccessfully, but several captured video footage on their cellphones. Cup Foods closed temporarily during the George Floyd protests in Minneapolis–Saint Paul and unrest in mid 2020, but re-opened in August 2020. The store changed its name to Unity Foods in 2023.

George Floyd Global Memorial 
George Floyd Global Memorial is a 501(c)3 organization in Minneapolis with a headquarters' office on the 3500 block of Chicago Avenue. The organization acts as a curator of the demonstrator-installed art exhibits at George Floyd Square. Its mission is to inventory, collect, and preserve the public art installations and the approximately 5,000 offerings that were left by visitors at the square.

See also 
 History of Minneapolis
 List of events and attractions in Minneapolis
 List of name changes due to the George Floyd protests
 List of streets in Minneapolis
 Memorials to George Floyd

References

External links 

 City of Minneapolis, 38th and Chicago
 Chicago Avenue Fine Arts Center
 Minneapolis Neighborhood Profile - Powderhorn Park
 Powderhorn Park Neighborhood Association

African-American history in Minneapolis–Saint Paul
Geography of Hennepin County, Minnesota
Memorials to George Floyd
Monuments and memorials in Minnesota
Neighborhoods in Minneapolis
Streets in Minneapolis